Bremang is a town in Kumasi Metropolitan District in the Ashanti Region of Ghana near the regional capital Kumasi

References

Populated places in the Ashanti Region